Sunburst Peaks is a  mountain summit located in Mount Assiniboine Provincial Park, in the Canadian Rockies of British Columbia, Canada. Its nearest higher peak is Wedgwood Peak,  to the south. The mountain is situated immediately southeast of Sunburst Lake, west of Lake Magog, and south of Cerulean Lake.

History

The first ascent of the peak was made in 1910 by Katherine Longstaff and her brother Dr. Tom Longstaff, with Rudolph Aemmer as their guide.

The mountain was named Sunburst Peak in 1953 after Sunburst Lake, which had been named by the Interprovincial Boundary Survey. The name was officially changed by the Geographical Names Board of Canada to Sunburst Peaks (plural) on February 15, 1983 with the intention extended to apply to three peaks.

Geology
Sunburst Peak is composed of sedimentary rock laid down during the Cambrian period. Formed in shallow seas, this sedimentary rock was pushed east and over the top of younger rock during the Laramide orogeny.

Climate
Based on the Köppen climate classification, Sunburst Peak is located in a subarctic climate zone with cold, snowy winters, and mild summers. Temperatures can drop below −20 °C with wind chill factors below −30 °C. Precipitation runoff from the peak drains into headwaters of the Mitchell River.

See also

 Geography of British Columbia
 Geology of British Columbia

References

External links
 Weather forecast: Sunburst Peaks
Mount Assiniboine Provincial Park
Sunset at Sunburst Peaks YouTube

Two-thousanders of British Columbia
Canadian Rockies
Kootenay Land District